Kang Yoon-koo (Hangul: 강윤구, Hanja: 姜倫求) (born July 10, 1990 in Seoul) is a South Korean a starting pitcher for the NC Dinos of the KBO League.

External links
Career statistics from KBO Official Website

Kiwoom Heroes players
KBO League pitchers
South Korean baseball players
1990 births
Living people